Tobias Welz (born 11 July 1977) is a German football referee who is based in Wiesbaden. He referees for SpVgg Nassau Wiesbaden of the Hessian Football Association. He was a FIFA referee between 2013 and 2019.

Refereeing career
He has officiated in the German Football Association (DFB) since 1999. His made his Bundesliga debut at 28 August 2010 in a game between 1. FC Nürnberg and SC Freiburg.

Personal life
Welz is a police officer with the Hesse State Police. He lives in Wiesbaden, where in his youth he played for SC Klarenthal 1968 and FV Biebrich 02.

See also
List of football referees

References

External links
 Profile at DFB.de 
 Profile at WorldFootball.net

1977 births
Living people
German football referees
UEFA Europa League referees
Sportspeople from Wiesbaden